Okemo Mountain Resort is a  ski resort located in the town of Ludlow, Vermont, United States. The resort experienced 600,000 skier visits in 2009. Parents Magazine rated it the Top US Family Snow Resort.

History

Okemo was founded in 1955 by a group of local businessmen. Operations officially began January 31, 1956, with four inches (102  mm) of snow and trails serviced by two Poma surface lifts. The lower poma cost 20 cents per ride, while the upper one cost 60 cents. The early 1960s saw the introduction of four more Pomas.  In these years, Okemo had a reputation of operating with all Poma platter lifts, while other ski areas used double chair lifts to serve advanced ski terrain.  The first chairlift, the Sachem double, was introduced in 1965. Along with all of these improvements, Okemo began to offer slopeside lodging starting in 1961. In 1963, Okemo purchased its first groomer, a Tucker Sno-Cat model. Snowmaking was first used, starting with the lower part of the mountain, in 1966.

The 1970s brought tough times for Okemo. There were fires, floods, and competition from the West. In 1982, the owners decided to sell the resort rather than go into bankruptcy. Tim and Dianne Mueller purchased the resort on August 2, 1982. While the resort was in danger of going bankrupt and the facilities were outdated, the Muellers wanted to preserve the historic feeling. They kept the name Okemo, which they claim is Native American for "All Come Home", although there is no evidence as to which Native American language this comes from.  According to the scholarship of John C. Huden, the name means Chieftain in Chippewa and a louse in Abnaki.  Certain trail names also continue to preserve this sentiment, such as Chief, Tomahawk, Wardance, Sachem, and Arrow, all of which are present on today's trail map.

Since 1982, Okemo has grown in many different ways. The facilities have been expanded in every aspect, including new chairlifts, trails, lodges, and snowmaking. Since purchasing Okemo, the Muellers have also acquired Mount Sunapee Resort in Newbury, New Hampshire, and Mount Crested Butte in Crested Butte, Colorado.

On December 6, 2008, the Muellers sold Okemo, Crested Butte and Mount Sunapee to a REIT, CNL Lifestyle Properties in a lease-back deal valued at over 130  million dollars. CNL sold the properties to Och-Ziff Capital Management in 2016. Och-Ziff owned the underlying assets of the resorts, while the Muellers continued to run the resorts.

In June 2018, Vail Resorts acquired Okemo, along with the Muellers' other resorts, at a purchase price of $82 million and $155 million to buy out the operating leases.

Mountain statistics
The base of Okemo stands at 1,144 feet (346 m) above sea level, and the summit is 3,344 feet (1,019 m). This gives Okemo the largest vertical drop in southern Vermont, 2,200 feet (670 m). The mountain has a total of 123 trails spread across  skiable terrain. Trail difficulty is almost evenly divided between novice, intermediate, and advanced/expert. Mountain Road can be driven during the summer and has parking spots for scenic viewing of the valley.

98% (654 acres) of the trail area is covered by snowmaking; one of the highest percentages in the East. The snowmaking pond has a total water capacity of 155  million gallons. In addition, the quality of the grooming is ranked sixth in the nation by SKI Magazine readers.

Trails
The trails built as each new part of the mountain have had some sort of theme, such as the Native American names on the main mountain and the astronomy-related names at the top of Jackson Gore. The following lists all of the trails by rating and name, alphabetically:

(g) – gladed trail with trees
(n) – natural trail without snowmaking (not including glades), although many of these are groomed after a snowfall to have a solid base
(m) – trail with moguls regularly when conditions provide

 See also Okemo Trail Map

Lifts
Okemo has 13 chairlifts, including four high-speed detachable quads, two 6-packs, five fixed grip quad chairs, and two triples. There are seven surface lifts, including six carpets and one t-bar that takes riders to the top of the halfpipe. Excluding carpets, these lifts combine to give the mountain a total uphill capacity of 29,850 people per hour.

South Ridge Quad B at the main base utilizes loading and unloading conveyors. This is the first unloading carpet to be used in the United States. The use of this system makes it easier for beginners to load and unload.

Lodges
Clock Tower Base Lodge: located at the base of South Ridge Quads A & B at the main entrance of the mountain, with daycare, ski shop, rentals, tickets, and food from the cafeteria, Caffé Origins, and the Sitting Bull Restaurant & Bar
Jackson Gore Base Lodge: located at the base of the Jackson Gore area and Coleman Brook Express Quad, with daycare, ski shop, rentals, tickets, and food from the cafeteria, selling more specialties than the other lodges, and Siena restaurant on the second floor; also attached is hotel-like lodging and Coleman Brook Tavern restaurant
Sugar House: located near the base of the Sunburst Six, with many unique dining opportunities, including a deli, a grille, pizza, and a café
Summit Lodge: located at the top of the main mountain, accessible from the Sunburst Six, Green Ridge Triple, and Glades Peak Quad, with a cafeteria, bar, and Asian cuisine
Solitude Day Lodge: located at the base of the Solitude area and Solitude Express Quad, with a full-service restaurant—Epic—and a small snack area

Skiing
There are five main areas at Okemo, each with at least one high-speed detachable quad. The main mountain is serviced primarily by the Sunburst Six.  The 1,700-vertical-foot cruisers, such as Chief, World Cup, and Jolly Green Giant are accessed from the Sunburst Six. When lift lines become crowded the Evergreen Summit Express can be used to reach the top of the mountain instead, although it loads at the middle of the mountain.  The main area also includes runs directed at more advanced skiers, such as Searle's Way, Sel's Choice, Nor'Easter, Defiance, and the Amp Energy Superpipe (Amp Energy sponsored halfpipe and snowboard park).

Solitude, to the north of the main mountain (right as one looks uphill), offers about 1,100 vertical feet. The Solitude area also has its own base lodge, hotel accommodations, and private trailside homes. Most of the trails in this area are intermediate cruisers, though some blacks exist, such as Exhibition and The Plunge.

This area is known for its more difficult terrain, including most of the double-black diamond trails. While some of the main thoroughfares are groomed nightly in this area, trails like Outrage and Forest Bump remain natural. There are also mogul trails in this area, such as Punch Line; Okemo marks its mogul trails. Okemo is also known for their bailout lanes, groomed sections on bump run where one can escape from the moguls.

The final area, on the far north (right), is Jackson Gore, complete with its own access road, lodge, ski school, and most other amenities also found at the Base Lodge. This area, served by one high-speed quad and one six-pack, has some of the steeper terrain on the mountain, as well as the standard green and blue trails. Access from the main mountain is provided through Jackson Gore Junction, over a bridge onto Blue Moon. An alternative is Jack-a-lope or Moonshadow to Southern Crossing, although this goes to the base area only rather than the lift to the peak.

Okemo's fifth area and its smallest is Glades Peak, between the main mountain and the South Face, serviced by one fixed-grip quad. It provides access to most trails on the mountain, including a couple that is exclusively served by its lift.

Summer activities 
The 2.9 miles (4.7  km) Healdville Trail for hikers starts at a small parking lot off Vermont Route 103 and ascends to the fire tower at the top of the mountain. Visitors can also drive up the mountain on the paved road known as the trail "Mountain Road" in the winter.  For road cyclists, Mountain Road has rated the 142nd most challenging climb in the United States  https://pjammcycling.com/climb/516.Okemo, and the 4th most difficult in Vermont. https://pjammcycling.com/zone/78.Vermont  There are lookout points to stop and take in the scenery along the way.

Across Route 103 sits the 18-hole, par-70 Okemo Valley golf course, rated the best public course in Vermont for 2006 by Golfweek. Run by Okemo, it is the first Heathland-style golf course built in Vermont. The whole course measures  and hosts two events on the  Vermont PGA Tour. Other amenities include a  year-round indoor training center, an  outdoor learning center, a clubhouse, a pro shop, and Yamaha golf carts. Adjacent to the course is Willie Dunn's Grille, a restaurant open every day during the summer (with breaks in between) for lunch and dinner.

In 2010 Okemo opened up the Adventure Zone in the base of Jackson Gore. The Adventure Zone is a year-round attraction which includes: The Timber Ripper, the first mountain coaster in Vermont, Lumberin' Cal mini-golf, The Maples disc golf course and the Stump Jumper Bungee Trampoline. New for the summer of 2012, the Canopy tour zip lines opened up for year-round access.

Okemo Mountain Resort has added lift-served mountain biking to its lineup of summer and fall amenities, in the heart of Vermont's Green Mountains. Okemo's South Ridge Quad-A provides access to more than three miles of trails in the resort's Clock Tower base area.

Wind power 
During August 2006, the Muellers announced they were switching to wind power for the upcoming ski season at their three resorts, Okemo, Mount Sunapee, and Crested Butte. The Muellers have bought 27 million kilowatt hours of renewable energy certificates from Sterling Planet, through a contract with Gunnison County Electric Association in Colorado, for about 15% more money than they were paying previously. It is estimated that this will prevent 18,800  tons of carbon dioxide emissions on a yearly basis.

Vail Resorts 
On June 4, 2018, Vail Resorts, a mountain management company based in Colorado, purchased Okemo as well as her sister resorts, Crested Butte and Mount Sunapee as part of an $82 million deal with Triple Peaks, LLC, which operates the three resorts.

References

External links 
 Okemo Mountain Resort official site
 Okemo Mountain Stats & Facts
 Okemo's Historic Timeline
 Okemo trail map
 Okemo Mountain Reviews & Photos from Vermont Living Magazine
 Lodging on Okemo Mountain

Ski areas and resorts in Vermont
Ludlow (town), Vermont
Buildings and structures in Windsor County, Vermont
Mountains of Windsor County, Vermont
Tourist attractions in Windsor County, Vermont
Mountains of Vermont
1956 establishments in Vermont